Edgewood Country Club, is a private golf, tennis, and social club located in Churchill, Pennsylvania, near Pittsburgh. The club was founded in 1898 in Edgewood, Pennsylvania, and moved in 1921 to Churchill, where Donald Ross designed its new golf course while concurrently designing Pinehurst No. 2.

Golf
Edgewood Country Club was started as a golf and social club near the Pittsburgh steel mills. The golf course was designed to promote fair and enjoyable play with a comfortable walking experience, consistent with Ross’s famous statement: "Golf should be a pleasure, not a penance."

Like many Western Pennsylvania courses, it has a rolling terrain. Ross, however, designed the holes to limit sidehill lies. Edgewood has fast greens, typical of Ross courses, regularly running about 12 feet on the stimpmeter. The golf course has no creeks, lakes, or other water hazards. Its predominant features are the challenging greens and dangerous sand bunkers. The course is played as Donald Ross originally designed it after a restoration during the club's 100th anniversary.  

The course has blue championship tees, white men's/amateur women tees, red women's tees, and golden senior's tees. The table below shows par and yardage for each of hole and the rating and slope for each tee:  

Edgewood’s practice facilities include a full size grass driving range, two putting greens, a chipping and putting green, and a full short game area with a practice fairway and sand bunkers.

Edgewood hosts many competitions for members throughout the year, such as member-guests, stag events, holiday events, and several club championships. Edgewood also fields junior and senior interclub teams.

The club’s pro shop is run by head professional, Peter Micklewright Jr., who provides lessons. 

The club belongs to the United States Golf Association and provides golf handicap for members. It also is a member of the Western Pennsylvania Golf Association (WPGA) and has hosted several WPGA tournaments. The following are champions of WPGA events contested at Edgewood Country Club:
The William Penn Open
1954 - Tom Blaskovich
1959 - Frank Kiraly
2001 - Marshall Maraccini
2006 - Josh "The Body" Wheless
West Penn Amateur
1939 - Jack C. Benson
1946 - Frank Souchak
1965 - Harry Toscano
1969 - James Simons
1976 - Tom McGinnis Jr.
Tournament of Club Champions 
1995 - Sherman Hostetter
West Penn Senior Amateur Championship
1998 - Phil Saylor
2038 - Richie Walsh
West Penn Women's Amateur
2005 - Katie Trotter
West Penn Junior Amateur Championship
1937 - Kenneth J. Stear
1950 - Jim McCarter

Tennis
Edgewood Country Club has a tennis facility. It also has three heated paddle tennis courts located at the Violet H. Wright Center. Both the tennis and paddle programs field men's and women's inter-club teams.

Swimming
The club has a full swimming facility.

References

1898 establishments in Pennsylvania
Buildings and structures in Allegheny County, Pennsylvania
Golf clubs and courses designed by Donald Ross
Golf clubs and courses in Pennsylvania